The Type 63 and Type 65 are Chinese self-propelled anti-aircraft gun based on the china type 58(T-34-85 produced in china) medium tank chassis.

Description
The Type 63 is a Type 58 produced by China converted into an anti-aircraft vehicle, armed with Chinese twin 37 mm Type 61 AA guns. The related Type 65 variant was instead based on the Type 58 chassis. None of the original Type 63's survive today.

The Type 65 retained the hull from the Type 58 but the turret was replaced by an open-top box turret armed with twin Type 61 37mm anti-aircraft guns. The guns were loaded manually with 5-round clips. While the Type 65 was on par with contemporary anti-aircraft systems, such as the M42 Duster, due to the lack of hydraulic elevation systems, the guns had to be elevated manually. Because of this, the Type 65 was ineffective against fast moving, low flying aircraft, and while it proved somewhat effective in the ground support anti-armour role, it was ineffective against then-modern main battle tank armour of the Vietnam War.

Construction 
The modification was made by bolting a steel plate over the opening in the hull for the turret with 27 bolts. The plate was reinforced with a vertical steel beam welded to the hull floor and the bottom of the roof plate. A twin 37mm Type 61 anti aircraft gun was removed from its 4-wheeled carriage and it's traversing gearbox was bolted to the middle of the steel plate. A turret was made from welded sheet metal and bolted to the floor of the anti aircraft gun mount. The only ammunition stowage was two metal bins, one located on each side of the outside of the hull. A travel lock made from channel iron is located on the engine deck of the tank.

Service history
Both Type 63 and Type 65 were supplied to the NVA by China during the Vietnam War. The NVA were supplied with several examples of the tank from China and used them during the Vietnam War, but only a small number were available due to the lack of adequate anti-aircraft equipment. It remained in service with the post-war People's Army of Vietnam, as well as the PLA, with the last numbers being retired in 1990.

One example of the Type 65 was captured by the ARVN 4th Infantry Regiment during the 1972 Easter Offensive. This vehicle was turned over to the United States military and shipped to Bayonne, New Jersey in the Summer of 1975. From there it was shipped to Aberdeen Proving Ground where it was evaluated. It was placed on display at the Aberdeen Proving Grounds where it remained until the early 2010s, when it was transferred to the Air Defense Artillery Museum in Fort Sill, Oklahoma.

Uncertainty over Origin 
There is disagreement over the origin of the tank. While many sources claim it is of Chinese manufacture, it may be a single Vietnamese improvised vehicle. It was crudely made, with basic materials which is common of improvised fighting vehicles, and little information on the vehicle exists in Chinese military archives, though recent studies indicate that such a vehicle was in service with the People's Liberation Army. The vehicle captured by the ARVN 4th Infantry Regiment is the only known example to exist. This vehicle did have the number "045" painted on at least the left and presumably both sides of the turret, which suggests there may have been more examples manufactured, but no other vehicles are currently known. Similar Vietnamese SPAAGs exist, including a T-34 hull with a 57mm anti-aircraft gun mounted in turret with a similar design, also missing the hull machine gun. However, recent studies have confirmed the existence of both Type 63 and Type 65.

Many sources state that the armament are paired "Type 63" anti-aircraft guns, however the Type 65 is the more likely armament, as the Type 63 AA gun is not mentioned in any sources beyond references to this self-propelled anti-aircraft gun. This could be due to the limited information on Chinese military equipment available in the United States during the Cold War.

Operators

Former operators
  - Remained in service until 1990.
  - A handful of examples supplied from China in the 1960s. Passed on to unified Vietnam.
  - At least one captured from the Vietnamese People's Army.
  - Small numbers retained after the Vietnam War.

References

Bibliography
 Hogg, Ian (2000). Twentieth-Century Artillery. Friedman/Fairfax Publishers. 
 Dougherty, Martin J. (2007). The World's Worst Weapons. Amber Books Ltd. 

Cold War weapons of China
Weapons of the People's Republic of China
Anti-aircraft guns of the Cold War
Anti-aircraft guns of China
Self-propelled anti-aircraft weapons of China
37 mm artillery
Military vehicles introduced in the 1960s